No. 627 Squadron was a Royal Air Force Mosquito aircraft pathfinder bomber squadron that operated during the Second World War.

History
The squadron was formed on 12 November 1943 at RAF Oakington from part of 139 Squadron. It was equipped with the de Havilland Mosquito twin-engined fighter-bomber it flew operations as part of No. 8 Group's light bomber force. As well as normal bombing missions it also carried out Pathfinder duties and was involved in attacks on Berlin in early 1944. In April 1944 it was transferred to No. 5 Group as a specialised target marking squadron, although it also carried out armed reconnaissance and normal bombing duties.
It was disbanded on 1 October 1945 at RAF Woodhall Spa when it was re-numbered 109 Squadron.

Aircraft operated

Squadron bases

Commanding officers

See also
List of Royal Air Force aircraft squadrons
Pathfinder

References

Notes

Bibliography

External links
 No. 627 Squadron in retirement
 No. 627 Squadron on RAF website (with text from Moyes 1976)
 History of No.'s 621–650 Squadrons at RAF Web

Bomber squadrons of the Royal Air Force in World War II
Royal Air Force aircraft squadrons
Military units and formations established in 1943
Military units and formations disestablished in 1945